The Short C-23 Sherpa is a small military transport aircraft built by Short Brothers. It was designed to operate from unpaved runways and make short takeoff and landings (STOL). It features a large squared fuselage with a full-width rear cargo door/ramp. The C-23A and C-23B are variants of the Short 330 and the C-23B+ is a variant of the Short 360.

Design and development
The Short 330 was developed by Short Brothers of Belfast from their earlier Short SC.7 Skyvan STOL utility transport. The 330 has a longer wingspan and fuselage than the Skyvan, while retaining the Skyvan's square shaped fuselage cross section, allowing it to carry up to 30 passengers while retaining good short field characteristics. The 330 entered commercial service in 1976.

In addition to the passenger aircraft, Shorts also planned two freight versions. The Short 330-UTT (for Utility Tactical Transport) was a military transport version fitted with a strengthened cabin floor and paratroop doors, which was sold in small numbers, primarily to Thailand, which purchased four. The Short Sherpa was a freighter fitted with a full-width rear cargo door/ramp. This version first flew on 23 December 1982, with the first order for 18 aircraft being placed by the United States Air Force in March 1983. These aircraft were assigned to Military Airlift Command (MAC) for the European Distribution System Aircraft (EDSA) role, flying cargo and personnel between United States Air Forces in Europe (USAFE) air bases.

The Sherpa's cabin is 6.5 ft (1.98 m) wide, 6.5 ft (1.98 m) high and 29 ft (8.84 m) long. It offers a cargo volume of 1,230 cu ft (34.83 m3), with a cargo capacity of 8,000 lb (3,629 kg). The Sherpa is also capable of operating from unpaved runways and making short takeoff and landings (STOL).

In U.S. military service, the Short 330 was designated C-23A Sherpa. The C-23B Sherpa is similar to the C-23A, but with cabin windows. The C-23B+ Short 360 derivative was created by replacing the rear fuselage of Short 360s obtained on the second-hand market with the twin tail and rear loading ramp of the Short Sherpa.

The C-23 was produced at the Short Brothers' facility in Belfast, Northern Ireland for the U.S. Department of Defense.

Operational history

U.S. Air Force
The C-23A Sherpa entered service with the United States Air Force in Europe in 1985 based at Zweibrücken Air Base. It continued in use in the EDSA role until November 1990 with the post-cold war force reductions. All the Sherpas returned to the United States; three aircraft were transferred to the USAF Test Pilot School at Edwards AFB, eight aircraft went to the U.S. Army and the remaining seven to the U.S. Forest Service. The Test Pilot School's aircraft were retired in 1997.

U.S. Army
The eight former USAF aircraft were used for test duties at different units; two were re-designated as JC-23A.

The Army purchased four civil Short 330 aircraft to replace the DHC C-7 Caribou being used to support the Kwajalein Missile Range. These were not given a C-23 designation, and were retired in 1992. In 1988, the Army ordered ten new-build Short 330s designated C-23B to replace the DHC C-7 Caribou used by the U.S. Army National Guard Aviation and Repair Activity Depots. In 1990, a further six were ordered.

When the Army wanted 20 more C-23s in 1990 the production line had closed; second-hand Short 360 aircraft were purchased instead. Designated the C-23B+, these were modified from the original single tail to the twin-tail and cargo ramp of the other C-23Bs. In 1994, another eight aircraft were converted to replace the DHC UV-18 Twin Otters used in Alaska.

During Iraq War (2003–2011), the C-23 served the Army's intra-theater needs of cargo and personnel transport. It provided an economic alternative for transporting some 20 people or three pallets of cargo when speed was not critical.

As part of the U.S. Army's Constant Hawk intelligence gathering program, five Short 360s were modified for use in Iraq and flew in theater between 2006 and 2011. A further two modified aircraft collided in mid-air before delivery to Iraq. The Constant Hawk aircraft were not given a military designation.

On 13 June 2007, the Alenia C-27J was selected to replace the C-23 in U.S. Army service. A total of 43 C-23s were in service with the U.S. Army as of November 2008 (all US C-27 aircraft were transferred to the US Coast Guard in 2012 due to budget shortfalls). The C-23 Sherpa was retired from the Army National Guard in January 2014. As part of the National Defense Authorization Act for Fiscal Year 2014, 8 C-23s may be transferred to the State of Alaska to operate from short rural runways for search-and-rescue and medium-lift missions.

In December 2014, it was announced that US would supply eight aircraft to Estonia, Djibouti, and Philippines.

Civilian and Army National Guard service

Several surplus aircraft were sold to United States operators, who used them to transport equipment and crews to remote work sites. Others were used by Army National Guard units in the various states.

On 3 March 2001, a C-23B Sherpa belonging to the 171st Aviation Regiment of the Florida Army National Guard was carrying 18 construction workers of the Virginia Air National Guard from Hurlburt Field, Florida to Naval Air Station Oceana, Virginia. The pilot left the flight deck to use the aft bathroom. His weight in the tailcone shifted the center of gravity sufficiently that the airplane became unstable when a patch of severe turbulence was encountered. The violent g-force shifts then encountered rendered the crew unconscious and caused the breakup of the aircraft in flight near Unadilla, Georgia, killing the 21 persons on board. Later calculations determined that the aircraft had been loaded outside its operating envelope at the start of the flight.

Variants
C-23A Sherpa Twin-engine transport aircraft for the U.S. Air Force based on the Short 330-UTT; it was fitted with a strengthened cabin floor with a roller conveyor system, plus a forward cargo door on the port side of the fuselage, equipped with a hydraulically operated full-width rear cargo door/ramp; 18 built.
C-23B Sherpa Twin-engine transport aircraft for the US Army National Guard, similar to the C-23A, but with cabin windows, stronger landing-gear, inward-opening paratroop doors at the rear of the fuselage and an air-operable two-section cargo ramp; 16 built.
C-23B+ Super Sherpa Short 360 aircraft purchased as used aircraft by the U.S. Army and modified by the West Virginia Air Center (WVAC) for the replacement of the rear fuselage of the Short 360, with its single tall fin, with the twin tail and rear loading ramp of the Short Sherpa. 28 civil aircraft were modified.
C-23C
Both C-23B and C-23B+ with flightdeck avionic upgrade under the "Avionics System Cockpit Upgrade" program, 43 modified.
C-23D
C-23C with upgraded avionics under the "Safety Avionics Modification" program from 2010, program was cancelled and only four aircraft were modified.

Operators

 Brazilian Army – Eight ex-ANG C-23B's acquired in 2016.

 Djibouti Air Force

 United States Air Force
 United States Army
 Army National Guard
 NASA
 United States Forest Service

Civil operators
Former USAF and US Army aircraft have been sold to civil operators including:

Royal Star Aviation

Era Aviation
Freedom Air
Richland County Sheriffs Department (South Carolina)

Aircraft on display
United States
Short 330-200 85-25343, a former Kwajalein range aircraft, at Millville Army Aviation Museum, Millville, New Jersey.
C-23C – N863DZ, which was US Army 93-01320, at Air Heritage Museum, Beaver County Airport, Pennsylvania.

Specifications (C-23A)

See also

References

External links

C-23 Sherpa page on Florida National Guard site
C-23 page on Global Security.org
C-23 page on theAviationZone.com
10th MAS C-23A Sherpa Zweibrücken AFB reunion site

1970s British airliners
Short Brothers aircraft
Twin-turboprop tractor aircraft
Aircraft first flown in 1984
High-wing aircraft
Twin-tail aircraft